The Georgian National Communications Commission is an independent regulatory authority that regulates TV broadcasting, Radio broadcasting, fixed/mobile telephone and internet services in Georgia.

The Commission was formed on July 1, 2000

Independency 
Commission is independent body and is not subordinated to any state authority, but during implementation process of important projects or reforms commission actively collaborates with the government and often is initiator of legislative changes. 

Commission presents its annual report to the President of Georgia, to the Parliament of Georgia and to the Government of Georgia.

Budget  
The Commission's source of income is regulation fee paid by authorized entities and license holders in broadcasting and electronic communications sectors. For the broadcasters defined regulation fee is 0.5% of income and for the authorized entities in electronic communications sector - 0.75% of their income.

Appointment 
The Commission consists of five members. The members of the Commission are elected for the term of 6 years by Parliament from candidates selected by the President.. The Chairman of the Commission is elected for the period of 3 years by the majority of staff by the Commission itself for one term only.

Since May 19, 2017 Chairmen of the Commission is Kakhi Bekauri. Members of the Commission are Vakhtang Abashidze, Eliso Asanidze, Giorgi Pruidze and Merab Katamadze.

Together with the Commission acts Public Defenders office of Consumers interests’ protection. On 2014, Tamta Tepnadze was appointed as public defender of consumer's rights.

Functions

Activities 
 Licensing/authorization of activities in broadcasting and electronic communications sectors 
 Disputes settlement between the authorized entities subjected to the Commission regulations, as well as between them and the consumers
 Issuance of Permits for numbering resource and radio frequency spectrum usage
 Study and analysis of various segments of the electronic communications market, identification of the authorized entities with significant market power, assignment of specific obligations to them
 Regulation of the access to telecommunications networks and infrastructure
 Promotion of standardization, certification and metrology service system implementation
 Control of compliance with the requirements of the applicable law in the communications sector and appropriate response

Former chairs

Reference

External links
 Georgian National Communications Commission on Facebook 
 Georgian National Communications Commission on Twitter 
 Georgian National Communications Commission on Youtube 
 Georgian National Communications Commission on Myvideo

Government of Georgia (country)
Communications in Georgia (country)
2000 establishments in Georgia (country)